Hooven may refer to:

 Hooven, Ohio, census-designated place in Ohio, United States
 Ed Hooven, Canadian politician
 Kate Hooven, American synchronized swimmer 
 Helen Hooven Santmyer, American writer, educator, and librarian

 Lane–Hooven House, historic house museum in Hamilton, Ohio, United States
 Hooven-Owens-Rentschler, a company that manufactured steam and diesel engines in Hamilton, Ohio